Loyola Industrial Training Institute, Bangalore in India offers two-year programs as well as an array of shorter courses to prepare technicians for private practice and for industry. The Jesuits began this work among disadvantaged youth and it has grown into a trade school with diverse offerings.

Courses 
 Electronic Mechanic
 Motor Vehicle Mechanic
 Computers
 Computer applications
 Hardware and Networking
 DIP & Web Design
 AC & Refrigeration

See also
 List of Jesuit sites

References  

Jesuit universities and colleges in India
Universities and colleges in Bangalore
1992 establishments in Karnataka
Educational institutions established in 1992